Kelly Sheffield (born July 14, 1970) is an American college volleyball coach and the current head coach for the women's volleyball team at the University of Wisconsin. He is also a former head coach of Dayton and Albany. In his rookie season coaching the Badgers' Sheffield took his team to the NCAA championship match, he is one of only three head coaches to lead their teams to the final match in their first seasons. The 12th-seeded Badgers upset the No. 1 seeded and defending national champion Texas Longhorns only to fall in the championship match to No. 2 Penn State in the 2013 NCAA championships.  In 2021, Sheffield coached the Badgers to the program's first ever National Championship, defeating No. 10 Nebraska in 5 sets.

Head coaching record

On January 20, 2017, the University of Wisconsin announced that Sheffield had signed a contract extension through January 31, 2022.

AVCA All-Americans Coached
Lauren Carlini (Wisconsin) - 2014-2016 First Team, 2013 Second Team, Courtney Thomas (Wisconsin) - 2014 Second Team, Taylor Morey (Wisconsin) - 2014 Second Team, Haleigh Nelson (Wisconsin) - 2015-2016 AVCA Second-Team All-American, 2014 Honorable Mention, Dominique Thompson (Wisconsin) - 2014 Honorable Mention, Ellen Chapman (Wisconsin) - 2013, Honorable Mention Blair Buchanan (Albany) - 2004, '05 Honorable Mention Megan Campbell (Dayton) - 2012 Honorable Mention; 2011 Third Team Lindsay Fletemier (Dayton) - 2010 Second Team; 2009 Third Team; 2008 Honorable Mention Rachel Krabacher (Dayton) - 2012 and 2011 Honorable Mention Samantha Selsky (Dayton) - 2012 Second Team; 2011 Honorable Mention Jessica Yanz (Dayton) - 2010 Honorable Mention

Coaching Awards
 2019 AVCA Northeast Region Coach of the Year
 2019 Big Ten Coach of the Year
 2014 Zimbrick Honda Madison Sportsman of the Year
 2014 Big Ten Coach of the Year
 2013 Volleyball Magazine National Coach of the Year
 2014 AVCA Northeast Region Coach of the Year
 2012 AVCA Northeast Region Coach of the Year
 2012 Atlantic 10 Coach of the Year
 2011 Atlantic 10 Coach of the Year
 2010 AVCA Northeast Region Coach of the Year
 2010 Atlantic 10 Coach of the Year
 2006 America East Coach of the Year
 2004 America East Coach of the Year

References

1970 births
Living people
Wisconsin Badgers women's volleyball coaches
American volleyball coaches
Sportspeople from Muncie, Indiana
Ball State University alumni
Clemson Tigers women's volleyball coaches
Houston Cougars women's volleyball coaches